Disini v. Secretary of Justice (G.R. Nos. 203335, et al.) is a landmark ruling of the Supreme Court of the Philippines handed down on February 18, 2014. When the Congress of the Philippines passed the Cybercrime Prevention Act of 2012 the bill was immediately controversial, especially its strict penalties for the new crime of "cyberlibel", an upgraded form of the already existing criminal libel charge found in the Revised Penal Code of the Philippines.

In the end, the Court declared that most of the law, including the cyberlibel provision, was constitutional. The ruling's abridgement of free expression has been widely criticized by critics of the law, including then attorney Harry Roque. The decision reached in Disini paved the way for the anti-fake news provisions of the Bayanihan to Heal as One Act.

Petition 
Several petitions were almost immediately submitted to the Supreme Court questioning the constitutionality of the Act upon its signing, including the petition of Jose Jesus M. Disini, Jr. on September 25, a Harvard-educated lawyer and law professor at the University of the Philippines College of Law from whose name the title of the case derives.

Initial deferment and protests 
On October 2, the Supreme Court initially chose to defer action on the petitions, citing an absence of justices which prevented the Court from sitting en banc. The initial lack of a temporary restraining order meant that the law went into effect as scheduled on October 3.  In protest, Filipino netizens reacted by blacking out their Facebook profile pictures and trending the hashtag #NoToCybercrimeLaw on Twitter. "Anonymous" also defaced government websites, including those of the Bangko Sentral ng Pilipinas, the Metropolitan Waterworks and Sewerage System and the Intellectual Property Office.

Temporary restraining order 
On October 8, 2012, the Supreme Court decided to issue a temporary restraining order (TRO), pausing implementation of the law for 120 days. In early December 2012, the government requested the lifting of the TRO, which was denied. The TRO consolidated all fifteen petitions filed up to that point into one case.

Oral arguments 

Over four hours of oral arguments by petitioners were heard on January 15, 2013, followed by a three-hour rebuttal by the Office of the Solicitor General, representing the government, on January 29, 2013. This was the first time in Philippine history that oral arguments were uploaded online by the Supreme Court.

Ruling 
On February 18, 2014, in a ruling penned by justice Roberto Abad, the Supreme Court ruled 12–1–2 that most of the law was constitutional, although it struck down other provisions, including the ones that violated double jeopardy. In total, §4(c)(3), §5 (only in relation to §4(c)(2), §4(c)(3), and §4(c)(4)), §7 (only in relation to sections §4(c)(2) and §4(c)(4)), §12, and §19 were struck down by the Court as unconstitutional.

Notably, "likes" and "retweets" of libelous content, originally themselves also criminalized as libel under the law, were found to be legal, and this was the only instance in which the court modified the interpretation of section 4(c)(4). Only justice Marvic Leonen dissented from the ruling, writing that he believes the whole idea of criminal libel to be unconstitutional, and assailing the Court for not finding so.

Of note also was the Court's justification for the higher penalties given to cybercrimes, such as prisión mayor (six to twelve years in prison) for cyberlibel:There exists a substantial distinction between crimes committed through the use of information and communications technology and similar crimes committed using other means. In using the technology in question, the offender often evades identification and is able to reach far more victims or cause greater harm. The distinction, therefore, creates a basis for higher penalties for cybercrimes.The Court's ruling also puts the burden of proof for whether or not there was malice on the defendant rather than the petitioner, even if the petitioner is a public figure. In his dissent in part, justice Antonio Carpio called this provision "clearly repugnant to the Constitution."

Motion for reconsideration 
While motions for reconsideration were immediately filed by numerous petitioners, including the Center for Media Freedom and Responsibility, they were all rejected with finality on April 22, 2014. However, justice Arturo Brion, who originally wrote a separate concurring opinion, changed his vote to dissent after reconsidering whether it was just to impose higher penalties for cyberlibel than for regular libel.

See also  
 People of the Philippines v. Santos, Ressa and Rappler

References

External links

Selected briefs

For petitioners

For government respondents

Rulings 
 
 

Supreme Court of the Philippines cases
2014 in the Philippines
2014 in case law
Cybercrime